JB Marks Local Municipality is a local municipality of South Africa. It was established after the August 2016 local elections by the merging of Tlokwe Local Municipality (which included Potchefstroom) and Ventersdorp Local Municipality.

The municipality was renamed after JB Marks in 2017, following the creation of the new municipality the year before. Other name proposals included Josie Mpama. Marks was born in Ventersdorp while Mpama was born in Potchefstroom.

Politics 

The municipal council consists of seventy-seven members elected by mixed-member proportional representation. Thirty-four councillors are elected by first-past-the-post voting in thirty-four wards, while the remaining thirty-three are chosen from party lists so that the total number of party representatives is proportional to the number of votes received. In the election of 1 November 2021 the African National Congress (ANC) lost their majority on the municipal council. 

The following table shows the results of the election.

Languages
The 2011 census indicated the following prevalence of languages for the combined municipalities of Tlokwe and Ventersdorp:
67.1% Setswana;  
17.4% Afrikaans; 
4.2% English; 
1.4% IsiZulu;
1.3% Sesotho;
1.0% IsiXhosa;
0.8% IsiNdebele ...

References

External links
 Official Website

Local municipalities of the Dr Kenneth Kaunda District Municipality